The 1963 season was Brann's 1st season after the league changed to 10 teams and was named 1. Divisjon.

First Division

Table

Cup

Squad statistics

References

1963
Brann
Norwegian football championship-winning seasons